Joseph Moore (November 27, 1869 – May 23, 1946) was a merchant and politician in Newfoundland. He represented White Bay from 1932 to 1934 as a United Newfoundland Party.

The son of Robert Moore, he was born in Carbonear and was educated there. He took over the family business after the death of his father in 1901. His son joined the business in 1927. Moore ran unsuccessfully for a seat in the Newfoundland assembly in 1919 and 1923 before being elected in 1932.

In 1892, he married Georgina Torphy. Moore died in Carbonear at the age of 76.

References 

1869 births
1946 deaths
United Newfoundland Party MHAs